Australasian pipit has been split into two species:

 New Zealand pipit, Anthus novaeseelandiae
 Australian pipit, Anthus australis

Birds by common name